Welcome Obama is a 2013 Indian Telugu-language drama film directed by Singeetam Srinivasa Rao, who also composed the soundtrack. A remake of the Marathi film Mala Aai Vhhaychy! (2011), the film stars Urmila Kanitkar, Rachel and Esteban. It focuses on a surrogate mother who bears a foreigner's child. The film was released on 20 September 2013.

Plot 
Lucy, an American woman, comes to India looking for a surrogate mother to bear her a child. She lands a deal with Yashodha, an impoverished single mother. Yashodha has an accidental fall when pregnant and the doctors conjecture that there is a risk of the baby being born deformed, leading to Lucy revoking the contract and returning to the United States. But Yashodha delivers a healthy and active boy named Krishna, and everyone calls him "Obama" due to his white skin. Years later, Lucy gets to know about the boy and comes to India to take him. But Yashodha, having developed a strong bond with Krishna, refuses to send him back.

Cast 
 Urmila Kanitkar as Yashodha
 Rachel as Lucy
 Esteban as Krishna

Production 
Welcome Obama, directed by Singeetam Srinivasa Rao and produced by Bharati Krishna under Sandalwood Media, is a remake of the Marathi film Mala Aai Vhhaychy! (2011). Urmila Kanitkar, the lead actress of that film, was chosen to reprise her role. British actress Rachel was chosen to portray an American woman, and French child actor Esteban was cast as the surrogate child. The dialogues were written by Rohini. Cinematography was handled by S. S. Darshan. Welcome Obama was shot on Eastmancolor film, as opposed to being shot digitally. Shooting was completed in 33 days.

Soundtrack 
The soundtrack was composed by Singeetham Srinivasa Rao who also worked as lyricist.

Release and reception 
Welcome Obama was released on 20 September 2013. Sandeep Atreysa of Deccan Chronicle wrote, "Certainly, this is not a runof-the-mill story Telugu audiences would watch often. But what went wrong? Slow-paced narration in the first half and a bad comedy track in second half." Sangeetha Devi Dundoo of The Hindu wrote, "There was a time when Singeetam Srinivasa Rao gave us some of the most entertaining films that broke new grounds both in storytelling and technical departments [...] Now, at the age of 82, when the filmmaker with unbeatable fervour comes up with a story that discusses surrogacy, it is natural to expect a social family drama that tugs at your heart strings while making observations about surrogacy. But as the drama unfolds, you are left looking for the missing magic of a once-brilliant filmmaker."

References

External links 
 

2010s Telugu-language films
2013 drama films
2013 films
Films about surrogacy
Films directed by Singeetam Srinivasa Rao
Indian drama films
Indian pregnancy films
Telugu remakes of Marathi films